Woodforde is a suburb of Adelaide within the Adelaide Hills Council. It is located about 10 km east of the Adelaide city centre.

Woodforde is in the State House of Assembly Electoral district of Morialta and is in the Federal Division of Mayo.

The Catholic boys' school Rostrevor College is located in the suburb.

Campbelltown City Council has an active boundary change proposal in place to incorporate part of this suburb along with a part of Rostrevor into its boundaries. This is despite an overwhelming 65% majority of residents and ratepayers opposing it in a survey conducted in 2019.

History
Lake Hamilton Post Office opened on 1 April 1880 and was renamed Woodforde later that year before closing in 1882.

Nomenclature
The popular spelling with a final "e" reflects the belief that it was somehow named for Dr. John Woodforde, who came out on the Rapid in 1838 with Colonel Light, and was later appointed City Coroner.
Geoff Manning agrees, but points out that Captain John Finlay Duff, who in 1850 laid out the subdivision of Hallett's section 342, Hundred of Adelaide, called it "The Village of Woodforde"', and so it appears in early conveyancing documents and in an advertisement (as "New Woodforde") in The Register on 28 August 1850.

References

External links
Adelaide Hills Council – Wards Map

Suburbs of Adelaide